Yewcic is a surname. Notable people with the surname include:

Thomas F. Yewcic (born 1954), American politician 
Tom Yewcic (1932–2020), American football and baseball player